The 1993–94 Illinois State Redbirds men's basketball team represented Illinois State University during the 1993–94 NCAA Division I men's basketball season. The Redbirds, led by first year head coach Kevin Stallings, played their home games at Redbird Arena and competed as a member of the Missouri Valley Conference.

They finished the season 16–11, 12–6 in conference play to finish in fourth place. They were the number four seed for the Missouri Valley Conference tournament. They were defeated by the University of Northern Iowa in their quarterfinal game.

Roster

Schedule

|-
!colspan=9 style=|Regular Season

|-
!colspan=9 style=|Diet PepsiMissouri Valley Conference {MVC} tournament

References

Illinois State Redbirds men's basketball seasons
Illinois State
Illinois State Men's Basketball
Illinois State Men's Basketball